Moaf Amandan (also Romanized as Mo‘āf Amandān) is a village in Taher Gurab Rural District, in the Central District of Sowme'eh Sara County, Gilan Province, Iran. At the 2006 census, its population was 211, in 72 families.

References 

Populated places in Sowme'eh Sara County